Mormor is a village and municipality in the Gadabay Rayon of Azerbaijan.  It has a population of 1,018.  The municipality consists of the villages of Mormor and Zamanlı.

References 

Populated places in Gadabay District